Joe Mitchell (born April 23, 1997) is an American politician from the state of Iowa. He was elected to the Iowa House of Representatives in 2018. Sworn in at the age of 21, he was the youngest member to ever be elected to the Iowa House. Mitchell is previously a student at Drake University.

Iowa House of Representatives
Mitchell serves as the Iowa House Assistant Leader, a leadership position in the Iowa House Republican caucus. Mitchell serves on the following committees: Administration and Rules, Commerce, Judiciary, State Government, Ways and Means, and the RIFF Budget Subcommittee.

Personal
Mitchell is the founder and chairman of Run GenZ, a nationally recognized nonprofit, with the mission to "prepare Generation Z leaders to take action, take charge and take control of the future by supporting the vision of the founders of this country and supporting conservative political values such as limited government, free market capitalism, individual responsibility and fiscal restraint."

Mitchell also owns and operates a real estate company based in Mount Pleasant that works to develop housing for rural communities.

References

1997 births
Living people
Drake University alumni
Republican Party members of the Iowa House of Representatives
21st-century American politicians